The Ohio Capital Conference is a high school athletic conference located in Central Ohio.  It comprises 32 public high schools located primarily in suburban Columbus, Ohio, encompassing Delaware, Fairfield, Franklin, Licking, and Union counties.  The league is geographically divided into four divisions of six teams each (Ohio, Central, Buckeye, and Capital) and one division of eight teams (Cardinal). Twenty-three schools compete in the OHSAA's Division I classification for football while eight schools compete in Division II.  All conference members compete in the Central District postseason tournaments prior to the regional and state tournaments.

Academically, 27 of the 32 members were rated 'Excellent' by the Ohio Department of Education during the 2010–11 school year.  Two were rated 'Effective' and three were classified under 'Continuous Improvement'. Effective in the 2011-12 season, every division except the Ohio Division faced realignment. The newest school to join the OCC is Olentangy Berlin (2018–19). The most recent school to leave is Mount Vernon (moved to the Ohio Cardinal Conference in 2016-17). The conference re-aligned with the 2020-21 school year.

Members

Future members

Former members

Membership timeline

Sports
The Ohio Capital Conference sponsors the following 23 varsity sports.

Boys sports
Baseball
Basketball
Cross country
Football
Golf
Lacrosse
Soccer
Swimming & diving
Tennis
Outdoor track
Volleyball
Wrestling

Girls sports
Basketball
Cross country
Golf
Gymnastics
Lacrosse
Soccer
Softball
Swimming & diving
Tennis
Outdoor track
Volleyball
Cheerleading

History

On December 6, 1966, five (5) schools met at Millers Village Inn in Gahanna to discuss the formation of a new athletic conference and develop a proposed conference constitution. The following Principals and Athletic Directors were in attendance:

 Gahanna Lincoln: Ben Webb and Byron Prushing
 Reynoldsburg: Joe Endry and Bill Starner
 Westerville: Dana Aukerman and Walt Bahorek
 Whitehall: Bob Strohm and Ray Schick
 Worthington: Lou Koloze and Dick West

The purpose was to approve the proposed constitution for the new league.  Joe Endry, Acting Chairman of the group, asked for suggestions for a name for the new league. Several suggestions were made and the name Ohio Capital Conference was unanimously chosen.

Chairman Endry called for a discussion of the proposed constitution of the Ohio Capital Conference. After a review and discussion. the Schools’ representatives stated that they were in agreement and were ready to sign the document.  Copies of the constitution were signed and the new constitution became a reality.

Original Members:  Gahanna Lincoln, Reynoldsburg, Westerville, Whitehall Yearling & Worthington
Invited to join:  Delaware Hayes, Mount Vernon, Pleasant View (now Westland)

1968-69 school year League Competition began with Gahanna Lincoln, Reynoldsburg, Whitehall Yearling, Westerville, Worthington, Delaware Hayes, Mount Vernon and Pleasant View (Westland) competing.

1974-75:  Groveport Madison & Hilliard join;  Westerville becomes "Westerville South";

1977-78:  Chillicothe & Westerville North join.  League begins play in two divisions.

1981-82:  Franklin Heights, Grove City, Upper Arlington, Pickerington. League votes to determine divisions by enrollment and "no sister schools in same division" rules.

1991-1992: Dublin, Marysville, Watkins Memorial, Worthington Kilbourne join.  "Worthington" becomes Thomas Worthington.  League divides into 3 divisions.

1995-1996: Newark and Dublin Scioto join the league. "Dublin" becomes Dublin Coffman.

1997-1998:  Big Walnut, Lancaster, Olentangy, Hilliard Darby join league.  "Hilliard" becomes Hilliard Davidson.  League divides into 4 divisions

2002-2003:  Whitehall Yearling leaves league. Central Crossing joins in their place.

2004-2005:  League divides into 5 divisions and abolishes the enrollment rule in determining divisions.  Dublin Jerome, Olentangy Liberty, Pickerington North & Westerville Central join league.  "Pickerington" becomes Pickerington Central.

From "History of the Ohio Capital Conference":
Mr. Workman, Chairman of the Alignment Committee, reviewed the proposed divisional alignment for the 2004-5 2005-6 seasons.
Mr. Workman stated that the Committee was aware that the proposed alignment is in violation of the enrollment concept but felt that there was no other choice because of the more important “sister school” concept.

2006-2007:  Chillicothe leaves league.  New Albany joins league.

2008-2009:  Hilliard Bradley & Olentangy Orange join league. League switches from 5 divisions to 4 divisions.  League abandons rule against sister schools in same division. (hence, schools from same district could be placed in same division.)

2013-2014:  Watkins Memorial leaves league.  Canal Winchester joins league.

2016-2017:  Mount Vernon leaves league.  League switches back to 5 divisions.

2018-2019:  Olentangy Berlin joins league.

2021:  Logan and Teays Valley invited to join the league beginning in 2024.

Football

Conference Championships By Year

Conference Championships By School

State Tournament Results By Year
Official OHSAA football tournament began in 1972

^Result prior to joining Ohio Capital Conference

Divisional Alignments

References

Ohio high school sports conferences